Shorooq Khalil Moh'd Shathli (born 6 January 1987), known as Shorooq Shathli, is a Jordanian footballer who plays as a midfielder for local Women's League club Shabab Al-Ordon and the Jordan women's national team.

References 

1987 births
Jordan women's international footballers
Jordanian women's footballers
Jordanian women's futsal players
Living people
Sportspeople from Amman
Women's association football midfielders
Footballers at the 2006 Asian Games
Footballers at the 2010 Asian Games
Footballers at the 2014 Asian Games
Asian Games competitors for Jordan
Jordan Women's Football League players
FIFA Century Club